The Cape Government Railways 3rd Class 4-4-0 of 1889 was a South African steam locomotive from the pre-Union era in the Cape of Good Hope.

In 1889, the Cape Government Railways placed 24 3rd Class tender locomotives with a  American type wheel arrangement in service. They were intended for passenger service on the Cape Western System.

Beyond Kimberley
In addition to increasing traffic on the Western System during 1887, the planned extension of the mainline northwards from Kimberley to Vryburg would also require an increase in the locomotive fleet. Michael Stephens, who had succeeded Hawthorne Thornton in 1885 as the Locomotive Superintendent of the Western System of the Cape Government Railways (CGR), therefore drew up detailed designs for a new 3rd Class passenger locomotive for the Western System. The drawings were prepared in the Salt River drawing office in Cape Town.

Manufacturer

An order for 24 of these locomotives was placed with Dübs and Company in Glasgow. The locomotives were built in two batches of twelve and were delivered early in 1889, numbered in the range from 93 to 116.

The overall design resulted in an attractive locomotive which reflected credit on the designer and the drawing office.

Service

Cape Government Railways
The locomotives were, at the time, modern and up to date with latest practices and were possibly the most efficient engines in the country. As was usual practice with passenger locomotives on the CGR, they were painted green and had polished brass domes. They were placed in service on the easier sections of the Western System and were used on all types of traffic. On the section between Beaufort West and Kimberley, they worked passenger trains successfully in spite of the poor quality coal from the colliery at Viljoensdrif, thanks to their more liberally-proportioned boilers.

During the Second Boer War from 1899 to 1902, at least one of these locomotives, no. 108, had armour plating fitted to protect the engine and crew from Boer small-arms fire. Two of the photographs show no. 108 in armour plating.

By 1904, six of the locomotives were transferred to the Midland System and renumbered in the range from 405 to 410. Here they were employed on the line between Port Elizabeth and Uitenhage.

South African Railways
When the Union of South Africa was established on 31 May 1910, the three Colonial government railways (CGR, Natal Government Railways and Central South African Railways) were united under a single administration to control and administer the railways, ports and harbours of the Union. Although the South African Railways and Harbours came into existence in 1910, the actual classification and renumbering of all the rolling stock of the three constituent railways was only implemented with effect from 1 January 1912.

All 24 locomotives survived to be taken onto the SAR roster in 1912. Since they were considered obsolete by then, they were designated Class 03 and renumbered by having the numeral "0" prefixed to their existing numbers. In SAR service, they continued to work on the Uitenhage line on the Midland System and on shunting and light duties on the Western System. Some of them survived until 1923.

Works numbers
The works numbers, original numbers and renumbering of the Cape 3rd Class of 1889 are listed in the table.

Illustration
The main picture shows no. 114 near Bulawayo in Southern Rhodesia, c. 1900, working on the line from the Cape of Good Hope through the Bechuanaland Protectorate.

References

0280
0280
4-4-0 locomotives
2′B n2 locomotives
Dübs locomotives
Cape gauge railway locomotives
Railway locomotives introduced in 1889
1889 in South Africa
Scrapped locomotives